You was a Japanese josei manga magazine published by Shueisha. The magazine was established in 1982 and based in Tokyo. The magazine was cancelled in May 2018 due to low readership, making the November 2018 issue the final issue.

Manga

 Riyoko Ikeda 
 Aki no Hana (ended)
 Mijo Monogatari (ended)
 Noriko Kasuya
 Watashi wa Shadow (ended)
 Yoko Komori
 Mermaid Scales and the Town of Sand (ended)
 Kozueko Morimoto
 Deka Wanko (ended)
 Gokusen (ended)
 Kōdai-ke no Hitobito (ended)
 Aya Nakahara
 Dame na Watashi ni Koishite Kudasai (ended)
 Dame na Watashi ni Koishite Kudasai R (ended)
 Masako Shitara
 Mr. Osomatsu (moved to Cookie)
 Hidaka Shoko
 Mizutama Puzzle (ended)

See also
Young You

References

External links
 

1982 establishments in Japan
2018 disestablishments in Japan
Defunct magazines published in Japan
Josei manga magazines
Magazines established in 1982
Magazines disestablished in 2018
Magazines published in Tokyo
Shueisha magazines
Semimonthly manga magazines published in Japan